Iran-Venezuela Bi-National Bank (Bank Mishiterk-e Iran vâ Vânuzuilâ) is an international financial institution that was founded in 2010 with an aim to develop commercial ties between Iran and Venezuela.

Out of the 40 banks legally licensed to operate in Iran, the Iran-Venezuela Bi-National Bank is one of the only five foreign banks to make that list.

History 
It started as a joint venture between two state-owned banks, Banco Industrial de Venezuela and Export Development Bank of Iran with a starting capital of $200 million offered equally by both parties.

In September 2013, the United States Department of the Treasury imposed sanction on the bank. In 2015, an official in the Central Bank of the Islamic Republic of Iran told press that "[the] bank is not given much freedom" and it is being managed one-sidedly by Iran, because the Venezuelan side does not participate in the general assemblies. By 2016, the Iranian side was willing to sell its share. In 2018, the US reimposed sanctions on the bank.

In July 2020, Iran officials announced the Iran-Venezuela Bi-National Bank would enter the Tehran Stock Exchange by March 2021 (17% to be floated on the stock market).

References 

Banks established in 2010
Banks of Iran
Banks of Venezuela
Joint ventures
Iran–Venezuela relations
Foreign banks in Iran
Iranian companies established in 2010